Nicole Hensley (born June 23, 1994) is an American women’s ice hockey player. She is currently a member of the Professional Women's Hockey Players' Association.

Playing career

USA Hockey 
Hensley was named one of three goaltenders to compete for the United States women's national ice hockey team at the 2016 IIHF Women's World Championship in Kamloops, British Columbia. Hensley was also named to the 2017 team, where she was in net for a shutout against Canada in the preliminary rounds, started the quarterfinal against Germany, and played in Team USA's 3–2 OT win against Canada for the championship. 

She made the 2018 Olympic team, where the United States won the gold medal, earning a shutout win over the Russian team in her only appearance.

Hensley was one of the goaltenders named to Team USA's rosters for the second half of the rivalry series between Team USA and Team Canada in 2019–2020.

On January 2, 2022, Hensley was named to Team USA's roster to represent the United States at the 2022 Winter Olympics.

NWHL
On June 12, 2018, Hensley signed a contract with the Buffalo Beauts of the National Women's Hockey League (NWHL). In her debut for the Beauts, Hensley earned a shutout win over Finnish Olympian Meeri Räisänen of the Connecticut Whale in a 4–0 final on October 7, 2018. In the 2019 NWHL All-Star Weekend, Hensley won the Chipwich Fastest Goalie competition.

PWHPA 
Hensley was scheduled to be one of three goaltenders to play in the PWHPA Dream Gap tour stop in Tokyo, Japan, along with Kimberley Sass and Alex Cavalinni.

Statistics
Statistics source

Awards and honors
 2014–15 All-CHA First Team

References

External links
 

1994 births
Living people
American women's ice hockey goaltenders
Buffalo Beauts players
Ice hockey players from Colorado
Ice hockey players at the 2018 Winter Olympics
Ice hockey players at the 2022 Winter Olympics
Lindenwood Lions women's ice hockey players
Medalists at the 2018 Winter Olympics
Medalists at the 2022 Winter Olympics
Olympic gold medalists for the United States in ice hockey
Olympic silver medalists for the United States in ice hockey
People from Lakewood, Colorado
Professional Women's Hockey Players Association players